Chal Ab Morad Ali (also Romanized as Chāl Āb Morād ʿAlī; also known as Chāl Āb and Chālū Āb) is a village in Kuhdasht-e Shomali Rural District, in the Central District of Kuhdasht County, Lorestan Province, Iran. At the 2006 census, its population was 254, in 49 families.

References 

Towns and villages in Kuhdasht County